= 1957–58 Plunket Shield season =

Cricket tournament in New Zealand

1957–58 Plunket Shield
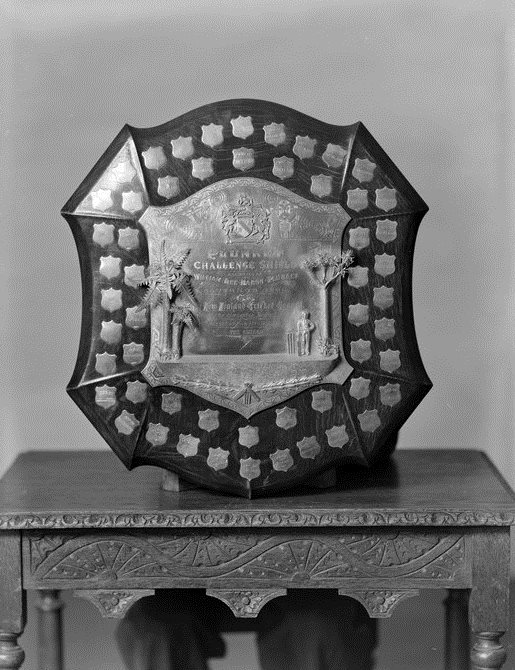
- The Plunket Shield trophy
- Cricket format: First-class
- Tournament format(s): Round-robin
- Champions: Otago (6th title)
- Participants: 6
- Matches: 15

The 1957–58 Plunket Shield season was a tournament of the Plunket Shield, the domestic first-class cricket competition of New Zealand.

Otago won the championship, finishing at the top of the points table at the end of the round-robin tournament between the six first-class sides, Auckland, Canterbury, Central Districts, Northern Districts, Otago and Wellington. Eight points were awarded for a win, four points for having a first innings lead in a draw and two points for a first innings deficit in a draw.

== Table ==
Below are the Plunket Shield standings for the season:

Team	Played	Won	Lost	Drawn	Points	NetRpW
Otago	5	3	0	2	30	6.229
Auckland	5	3	1	1	28	5.750
Wellington	5	2	1	2	24	1.145
Central Districts	5	1	2	2	12	-3.450
Northern Districts	5	1	3	1	10	-7.574
Canterbury	5	0	3	2	6	-1.846
